= Bherupura =

- village
- Location within Madhya Pradesh Location within India
- Coordinates: 23.35427318°N 77.41097689°E
- Country: India
- State: Madhya Pradesh
- District: Bhopal
- Tehsil: Huzur
- Elevation: 483 m (1,585 ft)

Population (2011)
  - Total: 731
- Time zone: UTC+5:30 (IST)
- ISO 3166 code: MP-IN
- 2011 census code: 482388

Bherupura is a village in the Bhopal district of Madhya Pradesh, India. It is located in the Huzur tehsil and the Phanda block.

== Demographics ==
According to the 2011 census of India, Bherupura has 145 households. The effective literacy rate (i.e. the literacy rate of population excluding children aged 6 and below) is 63.43%.

Demographics (2011 Census)
	Total	Male	Female
Population	731	402	329
Children aged below 6 years	102	53	49
Scheduled caste	150	84	66
Scheduled tribe	85	47	38
Literates	399	250	149
Workers (all)	235	179	56
Main workers (total)	128	115	13
Main workers: Cultivators	68	64	4
Main workers: Agricultural labourers	24	24	0
Main workers: Household industry workers	1	1	0
Main workers: Other	35	26	9
Marginal workers (total)	107	64	43
Marginal workers: Cultivators	2	1	1
Marginal workers: Agricultural labourers	92	50	42
Marginal workers: Household industry workers	1	1	0
Marginal workers: Others	12	12	0
Non-workers	496	223	273
